Marina Monjarás is a political activist in El Salvador. She has long been with the main opposition party Farabundo Martí National Liberation Front (Frente Farabundo Martí para la Liberación Nacional). On July 2, 2006, her parents Francisco Antonio Manzanares, 77, and  Juana Monjarás de Manzanares, 75, were brutally murdered. Amnesty International launched a letter-writing campaign asking people to urge the President and Attorney General to conduct a thorough investigation and ensure the safety of Marina.

See also 
 El Salvador
 Adrian Esquino Lisco
 María Julia Hernández
 José Castellanos Contreras

External links 
 Amnesty International (Canada) Urgent Action

Salvadoran activists
Salvadoran women activists
21st-century Salvadoran women politicians
21st-century Salvadoran politicians
Living people
Year of birth missing (living people)